Republic Airways Inc. is a regional airline subsidiary of Republic Airways Holdings that operates service as American Eagle, Delta Connection, and United Express using a fleet of Embraer 170 and Embraer 175 regional jets. It is headquartered in Indianapolis, Indiana. Its call sign "Brickyard" is derived from the nickname of the Indianapolis Motor Speedway.

History

In 1999, Republic Airways Holdings incorporated a new subsidiary, "Republic Airline, Inc." but the subsidiary had no activity prior to 2004 and no ability to operate aircraft prior to 2005. In 2004 the holding company activated Republic Airways in reaction to a pilots' suit against American Airlines.

American had awarded the flying of 44-seat regional jets to Chautauqua Airlines, then the main operating subsidiary of Republic Airways Holdings. However, Chautauqua later started to operate 70-seat regional jets on behalf of United Airlines, and this caused American to be in violation of its pilot union scope clause, which prevented an airline from operating on behalf of American if that airline was operating jet aircraft of more than 50 seats, even if such aircraft were operating on behalf of a carrier other than American. To repair the situation, Republic Airways Holdings activated Republic Airline, and upon Part 121 certification in 2005 allowing Republic Airline to operate commercial service. Republic Airways Holdings then transferred the offending 70-seat regional jets from Chautauqua to Republic Airline. American was then no longer in violation of its pilot union scope clause. Republic Airways Holdings paid $6.6 million to the pilot union of American Airlines to settle the issue.

US Airways' pilots had a scope clause prohibiting the airline from operating large regional jets such as the Embraer E170. The airline negotiated around this clause by offering flight deck jobs to laid-off US Airways pilots, in a program known as "Jets for Jobs". This agreement created a subsidiary, MidAtlantic Airways. As part of US Airways' bankruptcy restructuring, the 25 Embraer E170s delivered to MidAtlantic were bought by Republic to help US Airways come out of bankruptcy; Republic operates them along with additional newly delivered aircraft.

In 2007, Frontier Airlines signed an 11-year service agreement with Republic Airways. Under the agreement, Republic would operate 17 Embraer E170 aircraft for the Frontier Airlines operation. The first aircraft was placed into service in March 2007, and the last aircraft was expected to be placed into service by December 2008. On April 23, 2008, Republic Airways Holdings (parent of Republic Airline) terminated its service agreement with Frontier Airlines, which entered Chapter 11 bankruptcy in early April 2008. Subsequently, Republic Air Holdings purchased Frontier Airlines in bankruptcy. Frontier-branded Republic Airways E190 aircraft provided regional capacity support. In September 2013, Republic Airways Holdings sold Frontier Airlines. As part of the sale, Republic Airways terminated the Frontier branded E190 from flying.

On February 1, 2008, Republic Airways opened a base at Port Columbus International Airport in Columbus, Ohio.

On September 3, 2008, Republic signed a new 10-year codeshare agreement with Midwest Airlines. The aircraft would be based at Kansas City International Airport beginning October 1, 2008. Twelve aircraft would be placed in service with Midwest. On June 23, 2009, Republic announced it would acquire Midwest Airlines for $31 million.

In January 2013, Republic Airways Holdings reached a capacity purchase agreement with American Airlines to operate Embraer E175 airplanes under the American Eagle brand beginning in mid-2013. Republic began service as an American Eagle affiliate on August 1, 2013, from Chicago to New Orleans, Pittsburgh, and Albuquerque.

On February 25, 2016, the airline filed for Chapter 11 bankruptcy protection. The airline was hit hard because of pilot shortages, but a new contract ratified in October 2015 helped restructure the airline. At the time of filing, Republic Holdings claimed $2.97 billion in liabilities and $3.56 billion in assets. On November 16, 2016, Republic Airways Holdings filed their Plan of Reorganization with intentions to emerge from Chapter 11 during the first quarter of 2017.

It was announced that parent company Republic Airways Holdings would merge subsidiaries Shuttle America and Republic Airways into one company, with Republic Airways being chosen as the surviving company. On January 31, 2017, Shuttle America merged with Republic Airways. In December 2018, the operating division was renamed Republic Airways to match its parent company.

As of January 31, 2017, Republic Airways has the largest fleet of Embraer E170 and Embraer E175 aircraft in the world.

Destinations
As of October 2022, Republic operates for United Express, American Eagle, and Delta Connection; below are the United Express destinations.

Fleet

Current fleet
As of April 2022, the Republic Airways fleet consists of the following aircraft:

Fleet development

The Embraer E175 made its United States domestic debut when the first aircraft was delivered to Republic Airways in March 2007. Total orders were for 36 aircraft, which were operated in an 80-seat configuration under the US Airways Express brand name.

In July 2010, Republic ordered a further 24 Embraer E190 aircraft.

In May 2012, Republic Airways agreed to fly the 28 Bombardier Q400s for United Express that bankrupt Pinnacle Airlines planned to return to its lessors. The Q400 fleet was retired in 2017.

Republic Airways Holdings signed a three-year contract in October 2012 with Caesars Entertainment Corporation where its Republic Airways subsidiary would operate five Embraer E190 aircraft to provide more than 1,500 charter flights annually for Caesars. Service began in January 2013. This contract ended in August 2015 and all E190 aircraft were sold or returned to the lease holders.

In January 2013, Republic Airways Holdings reached a capacity purchase agreement with American Airlines to operate 47 Embraer E175 airplanes under the American Eagle brand beginning in mid-2013. The regional jets would be deployed out of American's Chicago hub. In addition, Republic would have options to purchase an additional 47 Embraer aircraft beginning in 2015. Republic took first delivery of the E175 jets in July 2013 and service began August 1, 2013, from Chicago to New Orleans, Pittsburgh and Albuquerque. Republic began using Miami as an American Eagle hub in October 2014 and in New York-JFK in May 2015.

In late 2015, it was announced Republic Airways achieved approval from the FAA for Extended Overwater Operations (EOW), which allows Republic to operate up to 162 nautical miles from shore. As of January 31, 2017, only Republic E175 aircraft operating for American Airlines are equipped to operate as an EOW aircraft. American Airlines uses Republic to operate aircraft out of Miami International Airport to various Caribbean and Central American destinations, including the Bahamas, Mexico, Panama, Belize, Honduras, Costa Rica, Turks & Caicos, Cuba, Guadeloupe, and the French West Indies.

In late 2016 it was announced, due to the impending merger with Shuttle America, that the 80-seat Embraer E175s operated for American Eagle (previously US Airways Express) would have the last row of seats removed (4 in total) to conform with Delta's scope clause, which limits all regional jets to a maximum of 76 seats. These aircraft were retrofitted to American's standard Embraer E175 layout.

On January 31, 2017, all existing aircraft operating under the Shuttle America operating certificate were transferred to the Republic Airline Inc. operating certificate, thus ceasing operations for Shuttle America, and completing the merger process of both subsidiaries. The move made Republic the largest operator of Embraer E170 and Embraer E175 aircraft in the world.

On December 20, 2018, Republic Airways announced that it had finalized a firm order for 100 Embraer E175 aircraft, stating that deliveries for the new aircraft would start in the second half of 2020 

In October 2019, Republic received the first of 30 E175s to be transferred from Compass Airlines upon the cancellation of their contract with Delta.

Retired fleet

Incidents
 On 9 April 2017, a passenger was forced off of a Republic-operated United Express flight in Chicago bound for Louisville. The passenger was forced off the flight by Department of Aviation officers after he refused to give up his seat to an airline employee. He attempted to run back onto the aircraft, but was forcibly removed. A video posted on social media showing him being injured and dragged off the plane led to a public outcry against United Airlines.
 On 21 June 2018, a Republic-owned E170 registered N876RW was damaged by a fire while undergoing maintenance at John Glenn Columbus International Airport. The aircraft was deemed to be damaged beyond economical repair.
 On 10 May 2019, a Republic-owned E175 operating Delta Connection flight 5935 was heading towards New York's LaGuardia Airport when a suicidal passenger attempted to open a cabin door in mid-flight, causing the pilots to declare an emergency shortly before landing. The situation was brought under control, after which the plane landed safely and was met by law enforcement at the gate.
On 6 November 2019, a Republic-owned E175 operating American Eagle Flight 4439 returned to Hartsfield-Jackson Atlanta International Airport after suffering severe controllability issues after takeoff: ATC flight data recorded the crew stating a "trim runaway" and a "stalling situation". The data shows the aircraft rapidly climbing to 15,100 ft (4,600 m) and slowing down to 160 knots (300 km/h) while performing nearly two full right turns.
 On June 4, 2022, a Republic Airways flight from Indianapolis to Chicago aborted its takeoff after an odor of smoke was reported in the aircraft. The aircraft was evacuated on a taxiway. No injuries were reported.

See also 
 Air transportation in the United States

References

External links

 

 
Regional airlines of the United States
Regional Airline Association members
Companies based in Indianapolis
Companies that filed for Chapter 11 bankruptcy in 2016
Airlines established in 1973
Airlines based in Indiana
American companies established in 1973